The Frata is a left tributary of the river Valea Morii in Romania. It flows into the Valea Morii near the village Frata.

References

Rivers of Romania
Rivers of Mureș County